Humanist Global Charity (HGC) is a 501c3 non-profit in California.

HGC was founded by Hank Pellissier, who stated in an interview that the organization "works toward a world with humanist values that respects science, secular education, sustainability, kindness, peace and democracy". The nonprofit provides secular support to at-risk populations internationally, via educational opportunities, technological solutions, health assistance and small business grants. HGC's work funds secular education, humanist students, women's collectives, orphans, safe houses, and helplines. It also offers internships in Africa & India Development.

History 
HGC's original name was the Brighter Brains Institute, founder Hank Pellissier launched its activities in 2015 by starting the "world’s first atheist orphanage" in Muhokya, Uganda.  The director - Bwambale Robert Musubaho - was orphaned himself at the age of five; he renounced religion in the early 2000s after researching his doubts and finding community on the internet. BBI raised enough money via crowdfunding to also build two ‘humanist’ primary schools and a secondary school near the orphanage. Freedom From Religion Foundation described the schools as "groundbreaking".

BBI expanded its secular activities throughout western Uganda, building classrooms for a remote school in the Rwenzori mountains, and constructing another humanist secondary school in Kanunga, the site of a 2000 Christian cult massacre. Brighter Brains Humanist Secondary School in Kanunga included a Richard Dawkins Science Laboratory and a Christopher Hitchens Freethinker Library. Funds were partially raised via promotion in the UK publication THE FREETHINKER.

In 2020–2021, BBI changed its name to Humanist Global Charity and expanded internationally.

Projects 
HGC provides about $100,000 a year for humanitarian aid projects. In addition to founding and supporting several humanist schools and orphanages in Uganda, HGC has funded sixteen humanist clinics that provided free medicine, works to dispel belief in witch doctors in superstitious communities, and distributes sanitary pads (AFRIPads) in Africa, India, and Nepal. HGC has partnered with women's collectives and LGBTQ organizations to emphasize equality and provide sex education, family planning, and birth control.

Board of Directors 
 Steven Pinker PhD - Honorary Board Member
 Daniel Dennett - Honorary Board Member
 Jennifer M. Hecht PhD - Honorary Board Member
 Alice Greczyn - Honorary Board Member
 Karen Zelevinsky - President
 Phil Zuckerman PhD - Executive Director 
 Mandisa Thomas - Board
 Yasmine Mohammed - Board
 Anthony Pinn PhD - Board
 Ophelia Benson - Board 
 Jessica Ahlquist - Youth Activism
 Hank Pellissier - Founder, Program Director, Treasurer

References

External links 
 Official website

Humanist associations
Secular humanism
Charities based in the United States
Humanism